Nzihi is an administrative ward in the Iringa Rural district of the Iringa Region of Tanzania. In 2016 the Tanzania National Bureau of Statistics report there were 15,562 people in the ward, from 14,872 in 2012.

Villages / vitongoji 
The ward has 5 villages and 45 vitongoji.

 Nyamihuu
 Chemchem
 Igingimali
 Isala
 Isupilo
 Kilimahewa
 Mabatini
 Majengo
 Makanyagio
 Mbuyuni
 Mkombe
 Mlangali
 Wilolesi
 Kipera
 Kipera ofisini
 Kisombambone
 Mbulula
 Mbuyuni
 Mifugo
 Mkola
 Mkwata
 Mkwawa
 Mlambalasi
 Magubike
 Chelesi
 Ibogo
 Igangilonga
 Kinyang'ama
 Kinyasaula
 mtakuja
 Nzihi
 Ihanzu
 Mazombe
 Mbega
 Mhanga
 Mimwema A
 Mjimwema B
 Nzihi A
 Nzihi B
 Ilalasimba
 George. Filiakosi
 Igunga Ndembwe
 Ilalasimba
 Ipangani
 James. Nzani
 Kalangali
 Kayugwa
 Kidamali
 Songambele
 Winome

References 

Wards of Iringa Region